Barngalow is a historic cure cottage located at Saranac Lake in the town of North Elba, Essex and Franklin County, New York.  It was built in 1905 and is a two-story wood-frame structure that was originally a barn and converted to residential use about 1910.  It has a bungalow form and features a gable roof and shed roof dormers.

It was listed on the National Register of Historic Places in 1992.

References

Houses on the National Register of Historic Places in New York (state)
Houses completed in 1905
Houses in Essex County, New York
Houses in Franklin County, New York
Bungalow architecture in New York (state)
American Craftsman architecture in New York (state)
National Register of Historic Places in Essex County, New York
1905 establishments in New York (state)
Saranac Lake, New York